Charles Catterall (16 October 1914 – 1 November 1966) was a South African boxer who competed in the 1936 Summer Olympics.

In 1936, he won the silver medal in the featherweight class after losing the final against Oscar Casanovas of Argentina.

At the 1934 British Empire Games, he won the gold medal in the featherweight class after winning the final against J.D. Jones of Wales.

1936 Olympic results
Below is the record of Charles Catterall, a South African featherweight boxer who competed at the 1936 Berlin Olympics:

 Round of 32: defeated Hans Wiltschek (Austria) on points
 Round of 16: defeated Jan Nicolaas (Netherlands) on points
 Quarterfinal: defeated Theodore Kara (United States) on points
 Semifinal: defeated Josef Miner (Germany) on points
 Final: lost to Oscar Casanovas (Argentina) on points (was awarded silver medal)

References
 

1914 births
1966 deaths
Featherweight boxers
Olympic boxers of South Africa
Boxers at the 1936 Summer Olympics
Medalists at the 1936 Summer Olympics
Olympic silver medalists for South Africa
Boxers at the 1934 British Empire Games
Commonwealth Games gold medallists for South Africa
Olympic medalists in boxing
South African male boxers
Place of birth missing
Place of death missing
Commonwealth Games medallists in boxing
Medallists at the 1934 British Empire Games